Armin Medosch (1962 – 2017) was an Austrian artist, curator, theorist and critic working in the fields of net.art, new media art and DiY networking.

Biography 
Medosch was born in Graz. He received his PhD from the Goldsmiths with research on the New Tendencies movement. As a journalist he wrote extensively on art and technology for publications in German and English, and on lists such as Nettime. From 1996 to 2002 he was co-editor of Telepolis: The Magazine of Netculture. For many years he collaborated with media art organisation RIXC co-editing issues of their Acoustic Space Journal and co-curating exhibitions, and collaborated with artist Shu Lea Cheang on the Kingdom of Piracy project. Medosch previously taught on the MA course on Interactive Digital Media at Ravensbourne (college), London (2002–07).

Medosch died of cancer in 2017, in Vienna.

Publications 
 "Shockwaves in the New World Order of Information and Communication", in A Companion to Digital Art, ed. Christiane Paul, Wiley-Blackwell, 2014, pp 355–383.
 New Tendencies: Art at the Threshold of The Information Revolution 1961-1978, MIT Press, 2016

References

External links 
 New Tendencies Research site
 Armin Medosch Bibliography on Monoskop

1962 births
2017 deaths
Academics of Ravensbourne University London
20th-century Austrian male writers
20th-century Austrian writers
21st-century Austrian male writers
21st-century Austrian writers
Male journalists
20th-century Austrian journalists
21st-century Austrian journalists